Enric Massó i Vázquez (1924–2009) was a Catalan engineer and mayor of Barcelona from 1973 to 1975.

References

Mayors of Barcelona City Council
Engineers from Catalonia
1924 births
2009 deaths
People from Barcelona
Francoism in Catalonia
FET y de las JONS politicians